Bert J. McKasy (January 10, 1942 – February 8, 2019) was an American lawyer and politician.

Background
McKasy was born in Saint Paul, Minnesota. He graduated from Saint Thomas Academy in Mendota Heights, Minnesota. He received his bachelor's and law degrees from University of St. Thomas and University of Minnesota Law School. McKasy practiced law in Mendota Heights, Minnesota. McKasy served in the Minnesota House of Representatives from 1983 until 1988 and was a Republican. He served as commissioner of the Minnesota Department of Commerce from 1991 to 1993. McKasy and his wife also owned the McKasy Travel Agency. McKasy died at his home in Mendota Heights, Minnesota.

Notes

1942 births
2019 deaths
Politicians from Saint Paul, Minnesota
People from Mendota Heights, Minnesota
University of St. Thomas (Minnesota) alumni
University of Minnesota Law School alumni
Businesspeople from Minnesota
Minnesota lawyers
Republican Party members of the Minnesota House of Representatives
State cabinet secretaries of Minnesota
20th-century American businesspeople
20th-century American lawyers